Khürelbaataryn Enkhtuya (born 6 September 1990), also commonly known as Enkhtuya Khurelbaatar, is a Mongolian parataekwondo practitioner. She competed at the 2020 Summer Paralympics in the 49 kg category, having qualified via World Ranking.

References

External links
 

1990 births
Living people
Mongolian female taekwondo practitioners
Taekwondo practitioners at the 2020 Summer Paralympics